Abaran may refer to the following places :

 Abarán, Spain
 Aparan, Armenia, formerly seat of the bishopric of Nakchivan

See also 
 Avaran (disambiguation)